Lectionary 55, designated by siglum ℓ 55 (in the Gregory-Aland numbering), is a Greek manuscript of the New Testament, on paper leaves. It is dated by a colophon to the year 1602.

Description 

The codex is an Euchologium with lessons from the Old Testament and 107 lessons from the New Testament. It is a lectionary (Evangelistarion, Apostolos), 
on 581 paper leaves. It is written in Greek minuscule letters, in one column per page, in 18-24 lines per page.

History 

The manuscript was written in Venice in 1602. It came from the monastery of Vatopedi on the Athos. 
The manuscript was examined by Matthaei. 

The manuscript is sporadically cited in the critical editions of the Greek New Testament (UBS3).

Currently the codex is located in the State Historical Museum, (V. 264, S. 454) in Moscow.

See also 

 List of New Testament lectionaries
 Biblical manuscript
 Textual criticism

Notes and references 

Greek New Testament lectionaries
16th-century biblical manuscripts
Athos manuscripts
Vatopedi